Frank Crossley may refer to:
 Frank Crossley (materials scientist), American engineer and pioneer in the field of titanium metallurgy
 Frank Crossley (actor), Australian comedian
 Francis Crossley, known as Frank Crossley, British carpet manufacturer, philanthropist and politician